Ochromolopis kaszabi is a moth of the family Epermeniidae. It is found in Mongolia, the Russian Far East, southern Siberia and China.

Subspecies
Ochromolopis kaszabi kaszabi
Ochromolopis kaszabi minima Budashkin & Satshkov, 1991 (southern Primorje)

References

Moths described in 1973
Epermeniidae
Moths of Asia